Elyria High School is a public high school in Elyria, Ohio. Founded in 1830, it is notable for being the first chartered high school west of the Allegheny Mountains. Elyria High School athletic teams are known as the Pioneers and compete in the Southwestern Conference.

All  but  the  Washington  building  were  demolished. A  new  athletic  wing,  academic  building,  cafeteria,  and  performing  arts  wing  were  all  built,  including  a  Performing  Arts  Center. The   Washington  Building  was  restored  as  well. The  buildings  were  completed  in  December  2011.

Buildings

Elyria High School has been through several reconstructions and additions throughout its history.
The oldest section, the Washington Building, built in 1894, is on the National Register of Historic Places. The Technology building was built in 1913 with additions constructed in the 1920s. The red-brick Lincoln Building was built in the 1950s on the former site of Lincoln School which was completed in 1924. It connects the Washington and Technology buildings. The vocational building stands separate from the rest of the school.  The last addition, including the big gym and auditorium, was completed in 1956. In 1996, Elyria West High School, the city's former second high school, was closed down and the students were consolidated for the start of the 1996-1997 school year.
Two separate facilities spread across the city are used for athletics, Pioneer Fields and Ely Stadium, which host soccer and football, baseball, track, and various other athletics and events respectively. With the passage of Issue 23 in November 2016, a new $14 million dollar athletic complex will be built on the current location of Ely Stadium, including soccer, baseball, softball, and various other athletic fields, as a new elementary school will be built at the location of the current Pioneer Fields.

Reconstruction

Due to Elyria High School's age and extremely poor condition that posed a safety hazard to staff and students, it has been reconstructed, having been supported by an issue known as Issue 7. Issue 7 was passed on May 8, 2007 after three previous attempts. The new building was constructed adjacent to the old high school and connects with the historical Washington Building, which was also renovated. The new school was built in phases, with phase 1 which included the main academics center being scheduled for conclusion by the beginning of the 2010-2011 school year. Following phase 1, demolition of the old building and construction of the gymnasiums and cafeteria began on the grounds of the old building and is connected to the new building and the entire construction project concluded for the 2011-2012 school year. The building was fully completed during the 2012-2013 school year, with the completion of the rooms for the JROTC program, located on the first floor of the Washington Building.

Notable alumni

Tracy Sprinkle Pro football player
Tony Curcillo, football player
Thelma Drake, politician
Tianna Madison, track athlete, 3-time Olympic gold medalist, 2-time world champion
Walter Rock, Class of 1959, pro football player, San Francisco 49ers, Washington Redskins 
Danny Noble, pro football player
Chase Farris, pro football player
Arthur Garford, Class of 1875, inventor of padded bicycle seat
Doug Gillard, Class of 1984, musician
Vic Janowicz, former baseball and football player, 1950 Heisman Trophy winner
James Kirkwood, Jr., author
Les Miles, head football coach of Kansas University Jayhawks 
Dasan Robinson, MLS defender, Chicago Fire
Chad Szeliga, drummer from band Breaking Benjamin, and current drummer of Black Label Society
Harrison Williams, Class of 1890, entrepreneur
Lester Lynch, Class of 1987, opera singer

State championships

 Wrestling - 1973
 Softball – 2002, 2009, 2017 
 Girls track and field – 2003

References

External links
District Website
Website dedicated to the rebuilding of EHS

Elyria, Ohio
High schools in Lorain County, Ohio
Public high schools in Ohio
1830 establishments in Ohio